Handy Andy is a 1921 British silent comedy film directed by Bert Wynne and starring Peter Coleman, Kathleen Vaughan and Warwick Ward.

Cast
 Peter Coleman - Handy Andy
 Kathleen Vaughan - Una O'Reilly
 Warwick Ward - Squire O'Grady
 John Wyndham - Michael Dwyer
 Wallace Bosco - Murphy
 Fred Morgan - Squire O'Grady
 May Price - Ragged Ann
 Hessel Crayne - Dr. Browling

References

External links
 

1921 films
Films directed by Bert Wynne
Ideal Film Company films
1921 comedy films
British comedy films
British black-and-white films
British silent feature films
1920s English-language films
1920s British films
Silent comedy films